Alan James Rogers (born 6 July 1954) is an English former footballer who played as a winger.

A left-footed player, Rogers joined Plymouth Argyle as an apprentice in 1970. He made his debut three years later, and played his part in the team that reached the semi-finals of the League Cup in 1974. The club won promotion back to the Football League Second Division one year later, but Rogers only made one league appearance due to injury. He joined Portsmouth in 1979, and helped the club win two promotions in three years between 1980 and 1983. He went on to play for Southend United and Cardiff City prior to retiring from the professional game. He played a total of 454 league and cup games during his football career.

Rogers played non-league football for Falmouth Town and Saltash United, before returning to Plymouth where he owned and ran the Swinton Hotel.

Rogers was inducted into the Portsmouth F.C. Hall of Fame in March 2018.

References

1954 births
Living people
Footballers from Plymouth, Devon
English footballers
Association football wingers
Plymouth Argyle F.C. players
Portsmouth F.C. players
Southend United F.C. players
Cardiff City F.C. players
English Football League players
Falmouth Town A.F.C. players
Saltash United F.C. players